Speak for Me may refer to:

 "Speak for Me", a 2003 song by Cat Power from You Are Free
 "Speak for Me", a 2012 song by John Mayer from Born and Raised